The French corvette Alecton was a ship in the French Navy in the 19th century. She is most famous for having been one of the first surface vessels recorded to have encountered a giant squid (Architeuthis). Until this time, giant squid were viewed as mythical creatures.

Service history
The Alecton, named after Alecto, one of the three Furies, was a paddle wheeler (aviso à roues de deuxième classe, type Étoile modifié) laid down in 1859 at the La Seyne shipyard of the Société des Forges et Chantiers de la Mediterranée and launched in 1861. She had a length of 50.9 metres and a beam of 12.1 metres. Alecton was powered by both a 120 hp steam engine and sails on two masts, had a crew of sixty-six and an armament of two light cannons. Her displacement was 570 tonnes. Alecton was first stationed at French Guiana and from 1868 onwards at Guadeloupe. She was decommissioned on 10 August 1883 and scrapped in 1884 at Lorient.

Bouyer's travelogue

 who served as captain on the Alecton wrote a travelogue, which first appeared as an article in Le Tour du Monde in 1866, later published as a book, La Guyane française: notes et souvenirs d'un voyage exécuté en 1862-1863 (1867).

These carried illustrations done by artists based on sketches made by officers on the Alecton and Bouyer himself. The illustration of the ship was by Édouard Riou, based on the sketch by E. Rodolphe, the ship-of-the-line ensign (enseigne de vaisseau) aboard Alecton.

The encounter with the gigantic squid occurred in 1861 when the boat was under his command.

Giant squid encounter

On November 30, or November 17, 1861 the French corvette Alecton was, on its way to Cayenne, navigating near Tenerife, the largest and most populous island of the seven Canary Islands. As the ship neared the island the lookout on duty yelled to the crew below: “a large body, partly submerged, on the surface”. The captain, Frédéric Bouyer, himself would later describe the monster as a "gigantic squid".

The captain had heard reports of giant squid but the scientific community disputed their existence. Mutilated, decomposed pieces of giant squid had surfaced, most notably off Zealand, Denmark in 1847, and another at The Skaw in 1854. Yet no one had ever captured or even seen a live specimen. Resolved to capture the monster, the captain ordered the ship to fire muskets, launch harpoons, and try to ensnare the squid with a noose.

Finally they managed to lasso a rope around its body. However, the weight was so great that when they tried to haul it aboard, the squid's body was torn and only the tip of the tail remained aboard, which weighed 14 kg according to the captain.

The fragmentary sample was definitely sent to a museum for study, but whether it still remained preserved could not be established by scholars by the following year, in 1862.

Twenty Thousand Leagues Under the Sea

The Alecton encounter of 1861 was the inspiration for the giant squids attacking the submarine in Twenty Thousand Leagues Under the Sea, a classic science fiction novel by French writer Jules Verne, published in 1870. Verne ascribed vicious behavior to the giant squid to paint it as a monster of legend, and the physical descriptions did not square with the living creature.

Explanatory notes

References 
Citations

Bibliography

  alt copy via BnF
 ; alt copy via BnF
 —440 pp.

External links

Ships built in France
1861 ships
Jules Verne
Giant squid